10 Sullivan is a triangular sixteen-story residential building between Sixth Avenue and Sullivan Street adjacent to the Holland Tunnel entrance in the SoHo neighborhood of Manhattan, New York City. The building was developed by Property Market Group and Madison Equities, and was designed by Tamarkin Co.

History and construction
Developers originally considered building a large tower in the northern portion of the lot, with the remainder set aside for a garden space. This configuration was originally replaced with a wedge-shaped design. The site was originally zoned for commercial development, until the developers appealed to the New York City Office of Administrative Trials and Hearings in order to change the zoning to residential.  

During construction and following the building's sluggish sales, 10 Sullivan was at the center of a bitter feud between the two developers, Madison Equities and Property Markets Group (PMG).  Madison Equities principal Robert Gladstone sued his partner Kevin Maloney of PMG, claiming among other things that PMG had sabotaged their joint condo development through negligence and mismanagement that cost the partners to lose out on $30 million in profits.  Gladstone's lawsuit also blamed PMG for 10 Sullivan's poor sales performance.  The case was eventually dismissed.

Design
The building evokes the Flatiron Building in its shape, and is one of several triangular buildings in New York, including 47 Plaza Street West. Cary Tamarkin, the building's architect, has said the design is not an homage, but a necessary adaptation to the shape of the lot. The exterior of the building is brick, and reminiscent of historical buildings in SoHo.

The New York Times has referred to the shape of the building as a "celebration".

Usage and amenities
The ground floor is commercial; the residential portion is split between apartments in the central building and townhouses in the northern portion of the lot. All units include high ceilings. Other amenities include a fitness center, storage spaces, and private elevators.

References

Residential buildings in Manhattan
Residential buildings completed in 2016
SoHo, Manhattan
Sixth Avenue